Oreodytes sanmarkii is a species of predaceous diving beetle in the family Dytiscidae. It has a holarctic distribution, found in aquatic habitats in Europe, northern Asia (excluding China), and North America. It has an affinity toward low-velocity currents and pebbly microhabitat substrates. It was described by Finnish entomologist Carl Reinhold Sahlberg in 1826.

Subspecies
There are two named subspecies of Oreodytes:
 Oreodytes sanmarkii alienus (Sharp, 1873)
 Oreodytes sanmarkii sanmarkii (C. R. Sahlberg, 1826)

References

Further reading

 
 
 
 
 

Dytiscidae
Beetles described in 1826